Sol de Verão (The Summer Sun in English) is a Brazilian telenovela produced and broadcast by TV Globo. It premiered on 11 October 1982 and ended on 18 March 1983. The death of lead actor Jardel Filho, when only 120 episodes out of the originally planned 155 were finished, caused the production to be cut short. The telenovela still ran for a further 17 chapters to wrap up the plot, for a total of 137 episodes. Since the telenovela that would succeed it in the timeslot, Louco Amor, hadn't yet begun production at that point, a truncated rerun of 1976's O Casarão was shown in the timeslot until Louco Amor's debut.

It was the twenty ninth "novela das oito" to be aired on the timeslot. It was created and written by Manoel Carlos and directed by Roberto Talma, Jorge Fernando and Guel Arraes.

Cast

References

External links 
 

TV Globo telenovelas
1982 telenovelas
Brazilian telenovelas
1982 Brazilian television series debuts
1983 Brazilian television series endings
Portuguese-language telenovelas